Helvetia is an American independent and experimental alternative music group from Seattle, Washington. The name Helvetia is the female personification of Switzerland, the childhood home of Jason Albertini.

Musical career 
Jason Albertini started Helvetia after the dissolution of the band Duster (in which he played drums).

Helvetia's first record, The Clever North Wind, was released in 2006 on the Static Cult Label and distributed by Up Records. Their first national exposure was achieved by touring with Built to Spill. Helvetia is produced and performed by Jason Albertini and sustained by a rotating live line-up, which has included C. Dove Amber, Jim Roth, Scott Plouf, Zeke Howard, and Samantha Stidham.

Their third release, Headless Machine of the Heart was released in 2008. The record was recorded entirely on a 4-track tape machine.

In 2012, Helvetia released the album Nothing in Rambling on Joyful Noise Recordings.

Helvetia released Dromomania on Joyful Noise on October 2, 2015.

In December 2022, Helvetia released Get Lost & Other Dimensions and announcing that Albertini, now the sole member of Helvetia, was "[ending] this phase of helvetia. I'm dealing with a health issue thats  going to put me on ice for a while." Later in March 2023, along with the release of Dream Faster, Albertini announced two other albums being released a week apart from each other, and also said, "If you are worried that I'm releasing too much music just remember that it will stop eventually", which concerned fans.

Discography

Studio albums
 The Clever North Wind (2006, The Static Cult Label, distributed by Up Records)
 The Acrobats (2008, The Static Cult Label)
 Headless Machine of the Heart (2008, The Static Cult Label)
 Helvetia's Junk Shop (2009, The Static Cult Label)
 Gladness (2001-2006) (2010, The Static Cult Label)
 On the Lam (2011, The Static Cult Label)
 Nothing in Rambling (2012, Joyful Noise)
 Dromomania (2015, Joyful Noise)
 A Dot Running for the Dust (2015, Joyful Noise)
 Fantastic Life (2020, self-released)
 This Devastating Map (2020, Joyful Noise)
 Essential Aliens (2021, Joyful Noise)
 Presents Sudden Hex (2021, Joyful Noise)
 Ugly Truth (2022, self-released)
 Dishes Are Never Done but Good Luck (2022, self-released)
 28 Songs & $3 Dollar Tears (2022, self-released)
 Gladness II 2001-2006 (2022, self-released)
 Star Gazer Trials (2022, self-released)
 Get Lost & Other Dimensions (2022, self-released)
 You Shot Past the Moon Scapegoat (2023, self-released)
 Dream Faster (2023, self-released)
 Dream Faster II (2023, self-released)

Compilation albums
 Camp Century Sessions (2012, self-released)
 The Original Gladness Tape (2022, self-released)

EPs
 Nothing but Ringo (2015, self-released)
 Sun Chasers (2020, Rainbo Records)

Singles
 Tears of Rage (2010, The Static Cult Label)
 Sing Songs by the Amazing Thinking Fellers Union 282  (2012, Joyful Noise)
 Spooky Action at the Sufferbus  (2013, Joyful Noise)
 Crumbs Like Saucers/The Road Crew (2015, Joyful Noise)
 A Dot Running for the Dust (2015, Joyful Noise)
 Christmas Time Is Here  (2016, Joyful Noise)
 Helvetia Xmas (2020, Joyful Noise)
 Questionable Youth (2022, self-released)

References

 Stereogum Interview
 Stereogum Band to Watch
 Rapid Transit Radio review
 Indie Rock Review of Helvetia's Junk Shop
 Pitchfork review of This Devastating Map
 Helvetia (Jason from Duster) preps ‘Essential Aliens,’ shares “New Mess
 Helvetia Announce New Album, Share Video For New Song “Reaktor”

Indie rock musical groups from Washington (state)
Musical groups from Seattle
Joyful Noise Recordings artists